Ferrari World Abu Dhabi  is a mostly indoors theme park located on Yas Island in Abu Dhabi, United Arab Emirates. It is the world’s first Ferrari-themed park and features Formula Rossa, the world's fastest roller coaster. 

The foundation stone for the park was laid on 3 November 2007. Developed by Aldar Properties and constructed by BESIX Group subsidiary Six Construct, it took three years to develop the park until it was officially opened to the public on 4 November 2010.

Mission Ferrari at Ferrari World Abu Dhabi is now open to public.

Rides and attractions

Roller coasters

Operating

Themed Experiences

Family rides

Children's rides

Entertainment

References

External links

 

Amusement parks in the United Arab Emirates
2010 establishments in the United Arab Emirates
 
Amusement parks opened in 2010